Vamshi is a south Indian word that means bamboo flute. Vamshi, Vamsi, or� Vamsy may refer to:

People
 Pasupuleti Krishna Vamsi (born 1962), Indian film director and producer
 Vakkantham Vamsi, Indian actor and screenwriter
 Vamsi Krishna, Indian actor
 Vamsi Mootha, Indian-American physician-scientist
 Vamsi Paidipally (born 1979), Indian actor
 Vamsy (born 1956), Indian film director, writer and music director

Other uses
 Vamshi (film), Indian Kannada-language action drama film

Hindu given names
Indian given names
Telugu names